Fu Linguo (born 1964) is a former major general in the People's Liberation Army of China. He joined the PLA in 1981 and attained the rank of major general in July 2010.  In May 2014 he was placed under investigation by the PLA's anti-corruption agency.  Previously he served as Deputy Chief of Staff of the PLA General Logistics Department (GLD). He once served as the secretary of Liao Xilong, while Liao was Head of the GLD.

References

1964 births
Living people
People's Liberation Army generals from Guizhou